Pygmy moray is a common name for several fishes and may refer to:

Anarchias similis
Gymnothorax robinsi